Mian Muhammad Islam Aslam is a Pakistani politician who was a Member of the Provincial Assembly of the Punjab from May 2013 to May 2018.

Life and career
Aslam was born on 2 May 1969 in Toba Tek Singh. He graduated in 1992 from the Islamia University and has the degree of Bachelor of Arts.

Aslam was elected to the Provincial Assembly of the Punjab as a candidate of Pakistan Muslim League (Nawaz) from Constituency PP-287 (Rahimyar Khan-III) in 2013 Pakistani general election.

References

Living people
Punjab MPAs 2013–2018
1969 births
Pakistan Muslim League (N) politicians